Okere Adams is a Sierra Leonean politician. In 2002, Adams was appointed as the Minister of Marine Resources under Ahmed Tejan Kabbah. In September 2005, he switched portfolio's with Chernor Jalloh and became the Minister of Tourism and Culture. Adams was replaced by Hindolo Trye upon Ernest Bai Koroma becoming President in September 2007. Adams is a member of the Temne ethnic group.

Sources
 Listing of cabinet of Sierra Leone

Year of birth missing (living people)
Living people
Government ministers of Sierra Leone
Temne people